The Comăneci salto is a gymnastics manoeuvre on the uneven bars, developed primarily by Romanian gymnast Nadia Comăneci. It is listed as an E-rated element in the current Code of Points. To perform a Comăneci salto, the gymnast begins in a support position on the high bar and, casting away from it, performs a straddled front somersault, regrasping the same bar. In the 2006 FIG Code, the Comăneci salto remained one of the hardest manoeuvres point-wise, and retained the E rating.

References

External links
Nadia Comaneci, performing the Comăneci salto
Hannah Toussaint, performing the Comăneci salto
Hana Ricna, performing the Comăneci salto

Gymnastics elements
Women's gymnastics